DTaP-Hib vaccine is a combination vaccine whose generic name is diphtheria and tetanus toxoids and acellular pertussis adsorbed with Haemophilus B conjugate vaccine, sometimes abbreviated to DTaP-Hib. It protects against the infectious diseases diphtheria, tetanus, pertussis, and Haemophilus influenzae type B.

A branded formulation was marketed in the US as TriHIBit by Sanofi Pasteur, and administered by using the Sanofi DTaP vaccine Tripedia to reconstitute the Sanofi Hib vaccine ActHIB. TriHIBit and Tripedia were discontinued in 2011. The current Sanofi DTaP formulation is Daptacel.

References

Combination drugs
Combination vaccines
Diphtheria
Haemophilus
Whooping cough
Tetanus
Vaccines